Arthur Finlay may refer to:

 Arthur Finlay (rugby, born 1854), Scottish rugby player
 Arthur Finlay (rugby union, born 1903), Australian international rugby union player

See also
 Arthur Findlay (1883–1964), writer, accountant, stockbroker, magistrate, and Spiritualist